Petra Pfaff (born 16 October 1960 in Hoyerswerda) is a retired East German 400 metres hurdler.

In 1980, a special edition of the World Championships was staged in Sittard, holding events not yet on the Olympic programme. Pfaff won the bronze medal in the 400 m hurdles behind compatriots Bärbel Broschat and Ellen Neumann. Pfaff later won the silver medal in the women's 400m hurdles at the 1982 European Championships behind Sweden's Ann-Louise Skoglund.

In 1983 she finished fourth at the World Championships. Her result was 54.64 seconds, the best time she had in her career.
 Pfaff represented the sports club SC Cottbus, and became East German champion in 1980.

Pfaff is 1.72 metres tall; during her active career she weighed 58 kg.

References

1960 births
Living people
People from Hoyerswerda
East German female hurdlers
World Athletics Championships medalists
European Athletics Championships medalists
World Athletics Championships athletes for East Germany
Sportspeople from Saxony